Toni Benetton (16 February 1910 in Treviso – 27 February 1996 in Treviso) was an Italian sculptor.

His work has been exhibited internationally, including at the Kunstsammlung Nordrhein-Westfalen in Düsseldorf, the Hirshhorn Museum and Sculpture Garden in Washington, D.C., the Museum Beelden aan Zee in Scheveningen, the Hakone Open-Air Museum near Tokyo and the 52nd Venice Biennale in 1986.

His son Simon Benetton is also a sculptor.

References

External links
Museo Toni Benetton
Toni Benetton su "La scultura italiana"
The Hakone Open-Air Museum near Tokyo.

1996 deaths
1910 births
People from Treviso
20th-century Italian sculptors
20th-century Italian male artists
Italian male sculptors
Italian contemporary artists